High-dimensional quantum key distribution (HDQKD) is a technology for secure communication between two parties. It allows for higher information efficiency than traditional binary quantum key distribution (QKD) protocols, which are limited to 1 bit/photon. HDQKD also exhibits higher resilience to noise, enabling lower signal-to-noise ratios and longer transmission distances.

Implementation

One way to implement HDQKD is by using space division multiplexing technology and encoding quantum information in the spatial dimension, such as with optical angular momentum (OAM) modes. While OAM modes have been demonstrated for HDQKD over free-space links, transmission over long-distance fiber links is challenging due to intermodal crosstalk. An alternative approach is to use multicore fibers (MCFs) with separate cores, which offer a large multiplicity of cores and low crosstalk between cores.

However, there are also challenges to implementing HDQKD with MCFs. Manipulating high-dimensional quantum states in MCFs requires precise phase stability, which can be difficult to achieve. In addition, transmitting quantum states through fibers can introduce noise and loss, leading to lower fidelity and higher quantum bit error rates (QBER).

See also
 List of quantum key distribution protocols

References

Cryptographic algorithms
Quantum information science
Quantum cryptography
Quantum cryptography protocols